Shooting competitions at the 2022 South American Games in Asunción, Paraguay are scheduled to be held between October 9 and 14, 2022 at the Polígono de Tiro.

Schedule
The competition schedule is as follows:

Medal summary

Medal table

Medalists

Men

Women

Mixed team

Participation
Eleven nations will participate in shooting of the 2022 South American Games.

References

Shooting
South American Games
2022